David Vaughan may refer to:

 David Vaughan (HBC captain) (died c. 1720), Hudson's Bay Company captain
 David Vaughan (architect) (c. 1810–c. 1892), Welsh architect, surveyor, land agent and diarist
 David Vaughan (Wisconsin politician) (1822–1890), American farmer and politician
 David Vaughan (British politician) (1873–1938), British Member of Parliament for Forest of Dean 1929–1931
 David Vaughan (dance archivist) (1924–2017), American archivist for the Merce Cunningham Dance Company, dance writer, critic and scholar
 David Vaughan (artist) (1944–2003), psychedelic artist
 David Vaughan (golfer) (born 1948), Welsh professional golfer
 David Vaughan (footballer) (born 1983), Welsh footballer who plays for Nantwich Town
 David Vaughan (glaciologist) (born 1962), climate scientist at the British Antarctic Survey
 David Vaughan Icke (born 1953), English conspiracy theorist
 David Vaughan (South Carolina politician) (born 1965), member of the South Carolina House of Representatives

See also
 David Vaughn (disambiguation)